The Conquest is a television series based on the conflict between the states of Wu and Yue during the Spring and Autumn period of Chinese history. The series was jointly produced by Hong Kong's TVB and mainland China's CCTV under executive producers Tommy Leung and Raymond Chai. It was renamed to Legend of the Heroic Duo for the mainland China release, where it aired two episodes every night on Zhejiang Satellite TV (ZJSTV) from 6 June to 28 June 2006, totalling 49 episodes. In Hong Kong, The Conquest aired five days a week on the TVB Jade network from 18 December 2006 to 10 February 2007, totalling 42 episodes.

Cast
 Joe Ma as King Fuchai of Wu
 Damian Lau as King Goujian of Yue
 Chen Kun as Fan Li
 Sonija Kwok as Xishi
 Power Chan as Wen Zhong
 Fan Zhiqi as Wu Zixu
 Feng Shaofeng as Crown Prince You of Wu
 Bonnie Xian as Princess Tengjue of Yue
 Li Ming as Bo Pi
 Xu Baixiao as Crown Prince Luying of Yue
 Lin Hai as Heyi, Queen of Yue
 Yan Qin as Zheng Dan
 Jia Ni as Meisi, Queen of Wu
 Zhuo Fan as Wang Sunluo
 Xian Yan as Yuenu
 Wang Yi as Wu Feng
 Pan Hong as King of Qi
 Fu Xinyin as Princess of Chen
 Liu Weihua as King Helü of Wu

Viewership ratings
The following is a table that includes a list of the total ratings points based on television viewership, derived from the TVB Jade network ratings in Hong Kong.

Awards and nominations
40th TVB Anniversary Awards (2007)
 "Best Drama"
 "Best Actor in a Leading Role" (Joe Ma)
 "Best Actor in a Supporting Role" (Power Chan)

See also
 The Rebirth of a King
 The Great Revival
 List of historical drama films of Asia

References

External links
  TVB.com The Conquest official page on TVB's website
  The Conquest on Sina.com

TVB dramas
Television series set in the Zhou dynasty
2006 Hong Kong television series debuts
2007 Hong Kong television series endings
Wu (state)
Yue (state)
Television series set in the 5th century BC